This is a summary of the use of Morse code to represent alphabets other than Latin.

Greek
The Greek Morse code alphabet is very similar to the Latin alphabet. It uses one extra letter for Greek letter  and no longer uses the codes for Latin letters "J", "U" and "V".

The tonos is not transmitted in Morse code; the receiver can simply infer which vowels require one. The Greek diphthongs presented in the bottom three rows of the table are specified in old Greek Morse-code tables but they are never used in actual communication, the two vowels being sent separately.

Cyrillic

Cyrillic letters are represented using the representation of similar-sounding Latin letters (e.g. ,  [German pronunciation], etc.). Cyrillic letters with no such Latin correspondence are assigned to Latin letters with no Cyrillic correspondence (e.g. ). The same correspondence was later used to create Russian national character sets KOI-7 and KOI-8.

The order and encoding shown uses the Russian national standard. The Bulgarian standard is the same except for the two letters given in parentheses: The Bulgarian language does not use , while  is frequent, but missing in Russian standard Morse.

The letter  (Yo) does not have an international Morse phonetic  equivalent, with international  used instead.

Hebrew
Hebrew letters are mostly represented using the Morse representation of a similar-sounding Latin letter (e.g. "Bet" ב≡B); however the representation for several letters are from a Latin letter with a similar shape  (e.g. "Tet" ט ≡U, while "Tav" ת≡T). Though Hebrew Morse code is transcribed from right to left, the table below is transcribed from left to right as per the Latin letters in the table.

Arabic

Persian

See also :fa:کد مورس

Devanagari

Devanagari is a left-to-right abugida (alphasyllabary) widely used in the Indian subcontinent. The following telegraph code table is adapted from one given by Ashok Kelkar, where the Latin letters are encoded as per the International Morse code standard. Some variations on this code exist, and there have been some attempts to introduce other telegraph codes either to improve efficiency or to apply to more Indian languages. Proposals for a telegraph code suitable for multiple Indian languages have been made as early as 1948, shortly after independence.

Japanese
See Wabun code.

Chinese
See Chinese telegraph code.

Korean
See SKATS.

Thai

See  on the Thai Wikipedia

References

 

Morse code